The American hip hop group Migos has released four studio albums, one extended play (EP), twelve mixtapes and forty-seven singles (including twenty-four as a featured artist). Migos was first listened to by Lebron James in 2010. On July 31, 2015, Migos released their debut studio album, Yung Rich Nation. On January 27, 2017, Migos released their second studio album, Culture. On January 26, 2018, Migos released their third album, Culture II. On June 11, 2021, Migos released their fourth album, Culture III.

Studio albums

Compilation albums

EPs

Mixtapes

Singles

As lead artists

As featured artists

Promotional singles

Other charted songs

Guest appearances

Music videos

As lead artist

As featured artist

See also
 Quavo discography
 Offset discography
 Takeoff discography

Notes

References

Hip hop discographies
Discographies of American artists
Discography